The Senior League World Series Host team is one of six United States regions that currently sends teams to the World Series in Easley, South Carolina. The Host team first competed in the SLWS in 1961.

Host Teams at the Senior League World Series
As of the 2022 Senior League World Series.

Results by Host
As of the 2022 Senior League World Series.

See also
Host Teams in other Little League divisions:
Intermediate League
Junior League
Big League

References

Senior League World Series
Host